The 21st World Science Fiction Convention (Worldcon), also known as Discon I, was held on 31 August–2 September 1963 at the Statler-Hilton Hotel in Washington, D.C., United States.

The chairman was George Scithers.

Participants 

Attendance was approximately 600.

Guests of Honor 

 Murray Leinster
 Isaac Asimov (toastmaster)

Programming and events 

Following the convention, Advent:Publishers published The Proceedings: Discon, edited by Richard Eney. The book includes transcripts of lectures and panels given during the course of the convention and includes numerous photographs as well.

Awards

1963 Hugo Awards 

 Best Novel: The Man in the High Castle by Philip K. Dick
 Best Fiction: "The Dragon Masters" by Jack Vance
 Best Professional Artist: Roy G. Krenkel
 Best Professional Magazine: Fantasy & Science Fiction
 Best Amateur Magazine: Xero, edited by Richard and Pat Lupoff

Other awards 

 Special Award: P. Schuyler Miller for book reviews in Analog magazine
 Special Award: Isaac Asimov for science articles in Fantasy & Science Fiction
 First Fandom Hall of Fame: E. E. "Doc" Smith

See also 

 Hugo Award
 Science fiction
 Speculative fiction
 World Science Fiction Society
 Worldcon

References

External links 

 NESFA.org: The Long List
 NESFA.org: 1963 convention notes 

1963 conferences
1963 in Washington, D.C.
1963 in the United States
Science fiction conventions in the United States
Worldcon